ASKA is a Ukrainian insurance company. It was established on 20 June 1990 as part of ASKO holding (Russia), ASKA Ukrainian insurance company has been operating as Ukraine's first private insurer since 1995.

Headquartered in Kyiv, Ukraine. The Chief Executive Officer is Andrey Olegovich Shukatko.

History
ASKA authorized capital made UAH 174.585 million as of 1 January 2011.

ASKA regional network includes 41 branches and 66 offices across Ukraine. ASKA Ukrainian Insurance Private Joint Stock Company operates as a subsidiary of System Capital Management Limited.

According to the results of 9 months of 2018, it became one of the ten largest insurance companies in Ukraine in terms of insurance payments.

References

External links
Official Website
System Capital Management

SCM Holdings
Financial services companies established in 1990
Insurance companies of Ukraine